Saude may refer to:

Saude, an old name for Sauda municipality, Rogaland, Norway
Saude, an old name for Sauherad municipality, Telemark, Norway

See also
Saúde (disambiguation)